Astrée was a 44-gun  of the French Navy, launched at Cherbourg in 1809. In December of the next year she captured HMS Africaine.  The Royal Navy captured Astrée in 1810 and took her into service under her French name, rating her as a 38-gun frigate, but then in 1811 recommissioned her as HMS Pomone. She served during the War of 1812 and was broken up in 1816.

French service

Astrée took part in the campaign in the Indian Ocean under Commander René Lemarant de Kerdaniel, serving with Hamelin's squadron. She also was present in the final stages of the Battle of Grand Port.

A few days later, on 30 August, Astrée recaptured the 1-gun schooner-aviso Mouche No.23, which HMS Nereide had captured 2 June.

Astrée came to be part of a squadron under Pierre Bouvet, who had assumed command of the French squadron at Grand Port after Duperré was wounded, and had been promoted to capitaine de frégate. The squadron also comprised  as a flagship, and the sloop .

Capture of HMS Africaine 

On 12 September 1810, Bouvet's squadron intercepted HMS Africaine (commanded by Commodore Corbett) off Saint-Denis, as the frigate , the sloop  and the brig  were sailing from the bay of Saint-Paul. Bouvet lured the British into pursuit.

At midnight Bouvet sent Astrée forwards, creating the impression that Iphigénie was to slow Africaine down to allow the rest of the squadron to flee. At 3 am, Astrée regained her place at the rear of the squadron. The weather, which had been rough, improved somewhat, and in the moonlight Astrée suddenly found herself at gun range of Africaine.

A gunnery duel followed immediately, which damaged Astrées rigging. She closed in to Iphigénie with Africaine in close pursuit. Africaine, her guns still trained at Astrée, soon found herself under fire from Iphigénie.  After half an hour of exchanging fire at point-black range, an exchange in which the French had the upper hand, the British attempted a boarding, which Iphigénie easily eluded. The boarding attempt gave Astrée an opportunity to rake Africaines bow. At 4:30, Africaine struck her colours.

All officers of Africaine had been killed or wounded in the action, save for Colonel Barry, and only 69 men were uninjured. Bouvet was given Corbett's dagger, which he kept ever since. The French abandoned Africaine and the next day  recaptured her.

On 3 December 1810, the Île de France fell to the British. The ships moored at the island were surrendered, including Iphigénie, Bellone and Astrée. The British took Astrée into service as a 38-gun fifth rate and renamed her HMS Pomone on 26 October 1811, the previous   having been wrecked earlier in the month.

British service

Pomone underwent repairs at Portsmouth from November 1811 to April 1812. She was commissioned under Captain Robert Lambert in February 1812. At some point Captain Francis William Fane took command, and on 23 May 1812 sailed her for Newfoundland. On 4 August Pomone recaptured Kitty, which the American privateer  had captured five days earlier. Pomone then sent Kitty into Newfoundland.

Captain Philip Cartaret took command of Pomone in December 1812.

On 26 May 1813, Pomone recaptured two Spanish vessels El Correv Diligente de Carraccas and Nostra Senora de los Desemperados. She apparently shared the salvage with Tuscan and some three other vessels.

Early on the morning of 21 October 1813, Pomone was in the Bay of Biscay repairing damage following a gale in which she had lost her fore-yard. By chance she fell in with a ship under jury masts that proved to be a French frigate.

Carteret was about to attack when another vessel, which also appeared to be a frigate, and a brig flying French colours, emerged from the haze, followed by three more indistinct vessels. To avoid hazarding Pomone, Carteret got well to windward of them. However, when the wind cleared in the afternoon it was discovered that they were all merchantmen except for the frigate under jury masts and the second frigate.

Carteret moved to attack the second frigate but she turned out to be a large Portuguese East Indiaman, which the French had taken and the British retaken. Carteret then sailed for four days in a fruitless search for the frigate under jury masts before he was able to find out that Andromache had captured her on 23 October.

An anonymous letter from "The Pomone's Ship's Company" was passed to the admiral at Lisbon asserting with respect to Carteret that "he had run from a French frigate". Carteret asked for a court martial to clear his name. When no one could be found to offer testimony against him, Carteret summoned those he suspected, plus one quarter of the ship's company chosen by lot. After the board had examined the witnesses it acquitted Carteret of all blame.

After service in the North Sea and the waters around France, Pomone sailed to the east coast of the United States to serve during the War of 1812.

On 6 December 1813 as John and James, Crosby, master, was returning from Chili with 1000 barrels of oil, Pomone captured her and sent her into Bermuda. Around that time Pomone also captured several more American vessels, including the sloop Grampus, and the schooners Anne, Primrose, Sally, and Enterprise.

With , Pomone captured the American privateer Bunker's Hill on 4 March 1814. Bunker's Hill carried 14 guns and had a crew of 86 men. Previously very successful, she had been cruising for eight days out of Morlaix without making a single capture. Bunkers Hill was the former Royal Navy cutter , which the French ship Gloire had taken about a year earlier on 25 February 1813 near Madeira.

The boats arrived safely back at Pomone and Dispatchs anchorage around 2:30-3:00 AM on Sunday, 2 October. In the space of about three hours they had captured the American merchant sloops Two Friends, Hope, Herald, Mercantile, and Fair American, and set fire to the sloop Oneida, all without firing a shot. The captured sloops were later ransomed back to their owners with the proceeds being used to support the blockade.

Pomone was also part of the squadron that captured  on 15 January 1815.

Fate
In the summer of 1815 Pomone was paid off at Chatham. She was broken up at Deptford in June 1816.

In fiction
HMS Pomone appears as part of Commodore Jack Aubrey's Mediterranean squadron in Patrick O'Brian's novel The Hundred Days.

Notes

Citations

References
 Sailing Ships of the Royal Navy
 

Frigates of the Royal Navy
Pallas-class frigates (1808)
War of 1812 ships of the United Kingdom
1809 ships
Ships built in France
Captured ships